Neohaemonia nigricornis is a species of aquatic leaf beetle in the family Chrysomelidae found in North America. Its range includes the northern United States and southern Canada.

References

Further reading

 

Donaciinae
Articles created by Qbugbot
Beetles described in 1837